Timothy Jan Kopinski (born 2 June 1993) is an American tennis player. On 5 August 2013, he reached his highest ATP singles ranking of 1940 and his highest doubles ranking of 615 achieved on 17 November 2014.

Tour titles

Doubles: 1 (1-0)

External links
 
 
 Illinois Fighting Illini profile

1993 births
Living people
American male tennis players
American people of Polish descent
Illinois Fighting Illini men's tennis players
People from Palos Hills, Illinois
Tennis players from Chicago